In Greece the all-numeric form for dates is in the little endianness order of "day month year".  Years can be written with 2 or 4 digits. For example, either 24/5/2004 or 24/5/04.

The 12-hour notation is used in verbal communication, but the 24-hour format is also used along with the 12-hour notation in writing.  The minutes are usually written with two digits; the hour numbers are written with or without a leading zero.

See also 
Time in Greece

Time in Greece
Greece